Old Mill, completed in 1798 as part of Murrays' Mills, is the oldest surviving cotton mill in Manchester, England. Sited on the Rochdale Canal in Ancoats, it was powered by a Boulton and Watt steam engine, and its narrow six-storey brick structure "came to typify the Manchester cotton mill". Old Mill was designated a Grade II* listed building on 20 June 1988.

References
Notes

Bibliography

Textile mills in Manchester
Cotton mills
Cotton industry in England
Former textile mills in the United Kingdom
Grade II* listed buildings in Manchester
Grade II* listed industrial buildings